Ypsolopha sylvella is a moth of the family Ypsolophidae. It is found in most of Europe.

The wingspan is 18–20 mm. Adults are on wing from August to September. There is one generation per year.

The larvae feed on the leaves of Quercus species, but also on other deciduous trees such as Corylus, Carpinus betulus, Betula and Myrica gale. They live in a slight silken spinning (a shelter like the web of a spider). Pupation takes place in a pale brown boat-shaped cocoon under a leaf, in a crevice in bark or among  plant debris on the ground.

References

Ypsolophidae
Moths of Europe
Moths described in 1767
Taxa named by Carl Linnaeus